Little Oakley is a village and former civil parish, now in the parish of Newton and Little Oakley, in North Northamptonshire, England. It is situated between Corby and Kettering. In 1931 the parish had a population of 85. On 1 April 1935 the parish was abolished and merged with Great Oakley to form Oakley.  Inside the village is St. Peter's church, which dates from the thirteenth century. Opposite the church is Primrose Cottage, a stone-built cottage dating back to the seventeenth century, where several generations of one family once lived and are now buried in the church yard.

The villages name means 'Oak-tree wood/clearing'.

References

External links

Villages in Northamptonshire
Former civil parishes in Northamptonshire
North Northamptonshire